Mae Nam Station is a railway station of eastern line located in Chong Nonsi Subdistrict, Yan Nawa District, Bangkok's east bank of Chao Phraya River. The station is a class special railway station and is located 9.87 km (6.13 mi) from Hua Lamphong railway station and considered to be the next station of Makkasan railway station to south, the distance is about 4.7 km (2.9 mi) and is close to Khlong Toei Port, Khlong Toei Market and Queen Sirikit National Convention Center in Khlong Toei District.

This station is a special station of the State Railway of Thailand (SRT). The station is not used for passenger services. It is a place for transporting cargoes and parcels includes fuels. There is a Chuea Phloeng Road (ถนนเชื้อเพลิง; lit: fuel road) between the platform and railway including no station sign like other stations. However, it is possible to book tickets in advance for general passengers.

Moreover, the area around the station is approximately 227 rai (about 89.72 acres). It is considered as a suitable area for many real estate investment projects.

References 

Railway stations in Thailand
Yan Nawa district
Railway stations opened in 1970